Sherman Stanley Edwards (July 25, 1909 – March 8, 1992) was a professional baseball pitcher who played in one game for the Cincinnati Reds on September 21, .

External links

1909 births
1992 deaths
Cincinnati Reds players
Major League Baseball pitchers
Baseball players from Arkansas
People from Mount Ida, Arkansas
Cleveland A's players